Neocollyris gracilicornis is a species of ground beetle in the genus Neocollyris in the family Carabidae. It was described by Walther Horn in 1895.

References

Gracilicornis, Neocollyris
Beetles described in 1895